Spinomatrix is a genus of monopisthocotylean monogeneans in the family Diplectanidae, containing the sole species Spinomatrix penteormos.

References

Diplectanidae
Monogenea genera